The Essential Toto is a greatest hits album by American rock band Toto. It was released in 2003 by Sony BMG, as part of the Essential series. Originally a single-disc compilation, a two-disc edition was released in 2004.

The single-disc compilation was re-released as Playlist: The Very Best of Toto on April 17, 2009.

Track listing

Single-disc edition
 "Hold the Line" – 3:56
 "Rosanna" – 5:30
 "Africa" – 4:58
 "99" – 5:15
 "Make Believe" – 3:43
 "I'll Supply the Love" – 3:46
 "Georgy Porgy" – 4:10
 "I Won't Hold You Back" – 4:56
 "I'll Be Over You" – 3:50
 "Without Your Love" – 4:53
 "Pamela" – 5:10
 "The Turning Point" – 5:27
 "Mindfields" – 6:13
 "On the Run" (Live) – 6:59

Double-disc re-release

Disc 1
 "Rosanna" (single version) – 4:01
 "Stop Loving You" – 4:28
 "Hold the Line" (single version) – 3:31
 "Caught In the Balance" – 6:21
 "99" – 5:11
 "The Other Side" – 4:39
 "I Won't Hold You Back" – 4:56
 "Africa" (single version) – 4:21
 "Don't Chain My Heart" – 4:42
 "2 Hearts" – 5:06
 "Waiting for Your Love" – 4:12
 "Make Believe" – 3:43
 "Goodbye Elenore" – 4:53
 "Home of the Brave" – 6:45
 "How Does It Feel" – 3:50
 "The Road Goes On" – 4:24

Disc 2
 "I Will Remember" – 4:22
 "Georgy Porgy" – 4:08
 "Just Can't Get to You" – 5:02
 "Pamela" (single version) – 4:30
 "Baby He's Your Man" – 5:40
 "I'll Supply the Love" – 3:45
 "Holyanna" – 4:15
 "The Turning Point" (single version) – 4:03
 "If You Belong to Me" – 3:58
 "Can You Hear What I'm Saying" – 4:58
 "Slipped Away" – 5:16
 "Dave's Gone Skiing" – 4:59
 "Without Your Love" (single version) – 4:29
 "Stranger In Town" – 4:43
 "Till the End" – 5:27
 "I'll Be Over You" – 3:48

Notes and references

Toto (band) albums
2003 greatest hits albums
Columbia Records compilation albums